The 2015 Road to the Kentucky Derby was a point system by which horses qualified for the 2015 Kentucky Derby. It consisted of 35 races, 19 races for the Kentucky Derby Prep Season and 16 races for the Kentucky Derby Championship Season.

Standings
Updated April 29, 2015.

 Entrants for Kentucky Derby in blue
 "Also eligible" for Kentucky Derby in green
 Sidelined/Inactive/No longer under Derby Consideration/Not Triple Crown nominated in gray
 Winner of Kentucky Derby in bold

Prep season

Note: 1st=10 points; 2nd=4 points; 3rd=2 points; 4th=1 point

Championship series

First leg of series
Note: 1st=50 points; 2nd=20 points; 3rd=10 points; 4th=5 points

Second leg of series
Note: 1st=100 points; 2nd=40 points; 3rd=20 points; 4th=10 points

"Wild Card"
Note: 1st=10 points; 2nd=4 points; 3rd=2 points; 4th=1 point

Notes

See also
Road to the Kentucky Oaks

References

External links

Road to the Kentucky Derby, 2015
Road to the Kentucky Derby
Road to the Kentucky Derby